Recall the Beginning...A Journey from Eden is the seventh studio album by American rock band Steve Miller Band. The album was released in March 1972, by Capitol Records. Like his previous album, Rock Love, this album did not meet with much success.

It was voted number 2 in the 50 All-Time Long Forgotten Gems from Colin Larkin's All Time Top 1000 Albums.

Track listing
All tracks written by Steve Miller.

Personnel
 Steve Miller – guitar, vocals
 Gerald Johnson – bass guitar
 Ben Sidran – keyboards
 Dick Thompson – keyboards
 Jim Keltner – drums
 Roger Allen Clark – drums
 Gary Mallaber – drums
 Jack King – drums

Additional personnel
 Jesse Ed Davis – guitar on "Heal Your Heart"
 Nick DeCaro – strings, horns
 Produced by Ben Sidran
 Recorded and balanced by Bruce Botnick
 Photography – Bill Walker
 Art direction – John Hoernle
 Album design & Serigraphy – Tom Lunde
 Album Coordinator – Lester T. Pouncy
 Recording completed on January 29, 1972

References

1972 albums
Steve Miller Band albums
Capitol Records albums